Gwon Geun (1352–1409) was a Korean Neo-Confucian scholar at the dawn of the Joseon dynasty, and a student of Yi Saek. He was one of the first Neo-Confucian scholars of the Joseon dynasty, and had a lasting influence on the rise of Neo-Confucianism in Korea.

Background
Gwon Geun was a Korean Neo-Confucian scholar at the time of the change from the Goryeo dynasty (during which Buddhism was a prominent philosophy) to Joseon. He was a member of the Andong Gwon clan that was very influential in the Goryeo court. He was a student of Yi Saek, and passed the first level of civil service examinations at the age of fourteen. He later went to Yuan China, and during his six years stay there he passed the second and the third level examinations. After his return to Korea, he became associated with the loyalist faction, and was exiled in 1389 for his defense of the loyalist minister Yi Sungin (1349–1392). While in exile he got involved in the faction's attempt to prevent the rise of Yi Seonggye, by alerting the Ming dynasty. His was acquitted when a flood that stopped the trial was accepted as an omen. A year later he returned from his exile and retired to the village of Yangchon, on which he based his pen name. However, king Taejo (R. 1392 - 1398) convinced him to devote his talent for the new dynasty.

At first, resentment from Jeong Dojeon's faction kept his role minimal, but Jeong Do-jeon and many of his colleagues were wiped out during the succession straggle of 1398. From that point until his death, Gwon Geun became the most important scholar in the government. During this time Gwon Geun directed the education system back toward literary accomplishments.

Importance

Gwon Geun lived and served during the dynastic change, and became eventually one of the architects of the Neo-Confucian ideology that provided both reasoning for the change, and ideological framework for the Joseon literati. He introduced Zhu Xi to the Korean audience, and his writings served as the basis for future scholars.

Among his writing on Neo-Confucianism, the most influential is probably the Iphak toseol (Diagrammatic Treatise for Entering upon Learning). He created this book for some students who came with questions in 1390 while he was in exile. He also wrote commentaries on the Book of Rites – A task entrusted by Yi Saek. He rearranged the text and added his own commentaries as well as those of Chinese contemporaries.  The work began in 1391 but ended only in 1404. Unfortunately his commentaries on the other classics are lost now. Gwon Geun developed a theory of ritual and emphasized the role of ritual in social order. He rearranged the Classic of Music, taking the first part as the original and the second part as a commentary.

Gwon Geun was a prolific writer, and he is also known for his contributions to several anti Buddhist texts, including his preface to Jeong Dojeon's Pulssi chappyeon (Arguments Against Mr. Buddha), as well as a contribution to the standardization of the sacrifices to pacify restless spirits.

Family
 Great-Grandfather
 Gwon Bu (권부, 權溥) (1262 - 1346)
 Great-Grandmother
 Lady Ryu of the Siryeong Ryu clan (시령 류씨, 始寧 柳氏)
 Grandfather
 Gwon Go (권고, 權皐)
 Father
 Gwon Hui (권희, 權僖) (1319 - 1405)
 Mother
 Lady Han of the Hanyang Han clan (한양 한씨, 漢陽 韓氏) (1315 - 1398)
 Sibling
 Younger brother - Gwon Woo (권우)
 Wife and children
 Princess Sukgyeong, Lady Yi of the Gyeongju Yi clan (숙경택주 경주 이씨, 淑敬宅主 慶州 李氏) (? - 1423); Daughter of Yi Jun-oh (이존오, 李存吾) (1341 - 1371)
 Son - Gwon Je (1387 - 1445)
 Daughter-in-law - Lady Lee (이씨, 李氏); daughter of Yi Jun (이준, 李儁)
 Grandson - Gwon Ji (권지, 權摯)
 Grandson - Gwon Ban (권반, 權攀)
 Grandson - Gwon Ma (권마, 權摩)
 Grandson - Gwon Hyeol (권혈, 權挈)
 Grandson - Gwon Hyeong (권경, 權擎)
 Granddaughter - Lady Gwon of the Andong Gwon clan
 Grandson-in-law - Han Myeong-jin (한명진, 韓明溍) (1426 - 1454)
 Unnamed great-grandson
 Unnamed great-granddaughter 
 Granddaughter - Lady Gwon of the Andong Gwon clan
 Half-grandson - Gwon Chu (권추, 權揫)
 Unnamed granddaughter-in-law 
 Son - Gwon Ram (권람, 權擥) (1416 - 6 February 1465)
 Daughter-in-law - Princess Consort Yeongwon of the Goseong Lee clan (영원군부인 고성 이씨, 寧原郡夫人 固城 李氏) (1410 - 18 October 1491)
 Grandson - Gwon Geol (권걸, 權傑)
 Granddaughter-in-law - Lady Nam of the Uiryeong Nam clan (의령 남씨, 宜寧 南氏)
 Grandson - Gwon Geon (권건, 權健)
 Granddaughter - Lady Gwon of the Andong Gwon clan
 Grandson-in-law - Han Seo-gu (한서구, 韓瑞龜)
 Granddaughter - Lady Gwon of the Andong Gwon clan
 Grandson-in-law - Park Sa-hwa (박사화, 朴士華)
 Granddaughter - Lady Gwon of the Andong Gwon clan
 Grandson-in-law - Shin Eok-nyeon (신억년, 申億年)
 Granddaughter - Lady Gwon of the Andong Gwon clan
 Grandson-in-law - Nam Yi (남이, 南怡) (1443 - 11 November 1468)
 Great-Granddaughter - Nam Gu-eul-geum (남구을금, 南求乙金), Lady Nam of the Uiryeong Nam clan (의령 남씨, 宜寧 南氏)[9]
 Granddaughter - Lady Gwon of the Andong Gwon clan
 Grandson-in-law - Kim Su-hyeong (김수형, 金壽亨)
 Granddaughter - Internal Princess Consort Yeongga of the Andong Gwon clan (영가부부인 안동 권씨, 永嘉府夫人 安東 權氏); Shin Su-geun's first wife
 Grandson-in-law - Shin Su-geun (신수근, 愼守勤) (1450 - 1506)
 Step-Great-Granddaughter - Queen Dangyeong of the Geochang Shin clan (단경왕후 신씨) (7 February 1487 - 27 December 1557)
 Granddaughter - Lady Gwon of the Andong Gwon clan
 Grandson-in-law - Shin Mal-pyeong (신말평, 申末平)
 Granddaughter - Lady Gwon of the Andong Gwon clan
 Grandson-in-law - Min Sa-geon (민사건, 閔師騫)
 Son - Gwon Gyu (권규, 權跬) (1393 - 1421)
 Daughter-in-law - Princess Gyeongan (경안공주) (1393 - 22 April 1415)
 Grandson - Gwon Dam (권담, 權聃)
 Grandson - Gwon Chong (권총, 權聰) (1413 - 1480)
 Daughter - Lady Gwon
 Son-in-law - Lee Jung-seon (이종선)
 Grandson - Lee Gye-ju (이계주)
 Great-Grandson - Lee Gae (이개) (1417 - 1456)
 Daughter - Lady Gwon 
 Son-in-law - Seo Mi-seong (서미성)
 Granddaughter - Lady Seo of the Daegu Seo clan (대구 서씨, 大丘 徐氏)
 Grandson-in-law - Choi Hang-e (최항에)
 Grandson - Seo Geo-gwang (서거광)
 Granddaughter-in-law - Lady Baek of the Suwon Baek clan (수원 백씨)
 Grandson - Seo Geo-jeong (서거정, 徐居正) (1420 - 1488)
 Granddaughter-in-law - Lady Kim; Kim Yeo-hoe's daughter (김여회)
 Granddaughter-in-law - Lady Lee; Lee Yeong-geun's daughter (이영근)
 Great-Grandson - Seo Bok-gyeong (서복경, 徐福慶)

Works
Iphak doseol  - Diagrams and Explanations upon Entering Learning  (Hangul: 입학도설, Hanja: 入學圖說)
Ogyeong cheongyeonnok  - Superficial Reflections on the Five Classics (Hangul: 오경천견록, Hanja: 五經淺見錄)
Saseo ogyeong gugyeol - Mnemonics for the Four Book and the Five Classics (Hangul: 사서오경구결, Hanja: 四書五經口訣)
Gwonhaksaui paljo - Eight Articles on Recommendations for Learning (Hangul: 권학사의팔조, Hanja: 勸學事宜八條)
Dongguk ssaryak - Concise History of the Eastern State (Hangul: 동국사략, Hanja: 東國史略)
Daeganjik imsamok - Admonition to the Appointment of Officials (Hangul: 대간직임사목, Hanja: 臺諫職任事目)
Yegi Cheon'gyeonnok - Comments on the Book of Rites (Hangul: 예기천견록, Hanja: 禮記淺見錄)
Sangdae byeolgok (Hangul:상대별곡, Hanja: 霜臺別曲)
Yangchonjip - Collected Works of Yangchon (Hangul: 양촌집, Hanja: 陽村集)

Popular culture
 Portrayed by Kim Cheol-ki in the 2014 KBS1 TV series Jeong Do-jeon.

Further reading

Ralston, Michael K. “Ideas of Self and Self Cultivation in Korean Neo-Confucianism.” PhD diss., University of British Columnbia, 2001.
Kalton, Michael C. "The Writings of Kwon Kun: The Context and Shape of Early Yi Dynasty Neo-Confucianism." In Wm. Theodore de Bary and JaHyun Kim Haboush, eds. The Rise of Neo-Confucianism in Korea. New York: Columbia University Press, 1985.
Kalton, Michael C. "Early Yi Dynasty Neo-Confucianism: An Integrated Vision." In Laurel Kendall and Griffin Dix, eds. Religion and Ritual in Korean Society. Berkeley: Center for Korean Studies, Institute of East Asian Studies, University of California, Berkeley, 1987.

See also
List of Korean philosophers

Notes

External links
 History of Seoul Metropolitan site (in Korean) 

15th-century Korean writers
Korean Confucianists
1352 births
1409 deaths
Neo-Confucian scholars
14th-century Korean philosophers